Murder Must Advertise is a 1933 mystery novel by Dorothy L. Sayers, the eighth in her series featuring Lord Peter Wimsey. Most of the action of the novel takes place in an advertising agency, a setting with which Sayers was familiar as she had herself worked as an advertising copywriter until 1931.

Plot
Death Bredon arrives at Pym's Publicity Ltd, an advertising agency, to take up the post of junior copywriter. He is assigned the room of his predecessor Victor Dean, who has died in a fall down the office's iron spiral staircase. The doctor states that death was caused either by a broken neck, due to his landing on his head at the bottom of the stair, or by a wound of the right temple. The death appears suspicious, as the victim apparently made no attempt to save himself as he fell. In Dean's desk Bredon discovers a part-completed letter to the firm's proprietor, Mr Pym, telling him that something 'undesirable' had been going on in the office.

Bredon befriends Pamela Dean, Victor's sister, so that she can get him into a cocaine-fuelled fancy-dress party hosted by Dian de Momerie, a socialite with whom Dean had been associating. Disguised as Harlequin, Bredon attracts the attention of de Momerie and later meets her several times, always in disguise. His presence annoys de Momerie's companion Major Tod Milligan who is supplying her with drugs.

It is revealed that Death Bredon is in fact Lord Peter Wimsey who has been brought in by Pym to investigate Dean's death. Various clues turn up: a catapult  belonging to 'Ginger' Joe, the office boy; a carved stone scarab belonging to Dean; and £50 in banknotes found in the desk of Mr Tallboy, group manager.

After having a drink in a Covent Garden pub, newspaper reporter Hector Puncheon discovers that someone has slipped cocaine into his coat pocket. Chief Inspector Charles Parker, Wimsey's brother-in-law, suspects that Puncheon has stumbled on Milligan's drugs gang, but finds no further suspicious activity there. It appears that the cocaine is being distributed from a different pub each week.

Puncheon spots a man from the pub who is behaving suspiciously, and who almost immediately falls in front of a train and is killed. Searching the man's flat, Wimsey and Parker discover a phone book with the names of many pubs ticked off, including the one in Covent Garden. Wimsey realises what has been happening. One of Pym's major clients runs a newspaper advertisement every Friday, the headline for which is approved a few days earlier. The first letter of the headline is being used to indicate the pub for that week, with Tallboy covertly supplying the letter to the gang in advance.

Milligan is killed in an 'accident', and Wimsey is nearly jailed for the murder of Dian de Momerie (also the gang's work). The police want to catch the ringleaders during their next weekly drug distribution. Using the phone book, all they need to find the next pub is the letter for the week – as provided by Tallboy.

Wimsey is sure that Tallboy killed Victor Dean, but he does not want to act until the gang has been rounded up. On the night of the next drug distribution, Tallboy comes to Wimsey's flat to confess. He says that he was lured into the scheme with an innocent-sounding story and the offer of money, when he was in financial difficulty, but soon became trapped. Dean had found out and was blackmailing him, so Tallboy killed Dean, using Ginger Joe's catapult and the scarab, making it look like an accidental fall on the staircase. Wanting to spare his wife and child, Tallboy proposes suicide. Wimsey, seeing a gang member watching in the street below his window, suggests Tallboy leave, on foot, without looking behind him. Both know that the gang's killers are waiting, and Tallboy is knocked down and killed as he walks home.

Principal characters
 Lord Peter Wimsey, 42, aristocratic amateur detective
 Chief Inspector Charles Parker, Wimsey's friend, married to his sister Lady Mary
 Mr Pym, proprietor of Pym's Publicity
 Mr Tallboy, group manager
 'Ginger' Joe, office boy
 Hector Puncheon, journalist
 Pamela Dean, sister of the deceased
 Dian de Momerie, socialite and drug addict
 Major Tod Milligan, drug-dealer and de Momerie's companion.

Literary significance and criticism
In their review of Crime novels (revised edition 1989), the US writers Barzun and Taylor called the novel "A superb example of Sayers' ability to set a group of people going.  The advertising agency is inimitable, and hence better than the De Momerie crowd that goes with it.  The murder is ingenious and Wimsey is just right".

Writing in 1993, the biographer Barbara Reynolds noted that "Sayers herself disliked the novel, which she wrote quickly in order to fulfil her publisher's contract, and was unsure whether it would ring true with the reading public". Reynolds quotes a letter that Sayers wrote to her publisher Victor Gollancz on 14 September 1932:

In her 1941 book The Mind of the Maker Sayers wrote: "I undertook (not very successfully) to present a contrast of two 'cardboard' worlds, equally fictitious—the world of advertising and the world of the post-war 'Bright Young People'. (It was not very successful, because I knew and cared much more about advertising than about Bright Youth)". But she went on to quote a reader who pointed out that "Peter Wimsey, who represents reality, never appears in either world except in disguise". She commented, "It was perfectly true; and I had never noticed it. With all its defects of realism, there had been some measure of integral truth about the book's Idea, since it issued, without my conscious connivance, in a true symbolism".

Background
Most of the action of the novel takes place in an advertising agency, a setting with which Sayers was very familiar as she had herself been employed as a copywriter at S. H. Benson's agency, located at Kingsway from 1922 to 1931. In chapter 12 of the novel she quotes the slogan "Guinness is good for you", from her own jingle "If he can say as you can. / Guinness is good for you / How grand to be a Toucan / Just think what Toucan do". Lord Peter, as Death Bredon, comes up with a brilliant advertising campaign for a cigarette, "Whiffling around Britain," which recalls the Colman's Mustard Club campaign on which Sayers herself worked extensively. Her colleague Bobby Bevan was the inspiration for one of the characters in the novel, Mr Ingleby.

Adaptations
Murder Must Advertise was adapted by Bill Craig for television in 1973 as a BBC TV mini-series starring Ian Carmichael as Lord Peter Wimsey. A six-part radio adaptation by Alistair Beaton was broadcast on BBC Radio 4 in January 1979, again with Ian Carmichael as Lord Peter Wimsey.

References

External links
 

1933 British novels
Novels by Dorothy L. Sayers
Novels set in London
Novels about advertising
British mystery novels
Victor Gollancz Ltd books
Novels set in the 1930s
British novels adapted into television shows